Magdalena Adriaantje (Magda) Berndsen-Jansen (born 4 May 1950) is a Dutch former politician and police officer, born in Leiden. As a member of Democrats 66 (D66) she was a member of House of Representatives of the Netherlands between 17 June 2010 and 1 November 2015. She focused on matters of safety, judiciary and police. She was replaced by Judith Swinkels.

Berndsen was mayor of Obdam and Beverwijk, and acting mayor of Súdwest-Fryslân and Dongeradeel, and also corps chief of Gooi en Vechtstreek Police and Friesland Police.

References

External links 

  House of Representatives biography

1950 births
Living people
20th-century Dutch women politicians
20th-century Dutch politicians
21st-century Dutch women politicians
21st-century Dutch politicians
Chiefs of police
Democrats 66 politicians
Dutch police officers
Mayors in North Holland
People from Beverwijk
Mayors in Friesland
People from Súdwest-Fryslân
Members of the House of Representatives (Netherlands)
People from Leiden
Women mayors of places in the Netherlands
Women police officers